Sonatrach is the national state-owned oil company of Algeria. Founded in 1963, it is known today to be the largest company in Africa with 154 subsidiaries, and often referred as the first African oil "major". In 2021, Sonatrach was the seventh largest gas company in the world.

Overview 

Sonatrach is the 12th largest oil consortium in the world, with 154 subsidiaries operating over the entire oil value-chain from upstream, to midstream, and downstream activities.

In 2002, its gross sales was 1,530 billion Algerian dinars for a net income of 175 billion.  With approximately 120,000 workers, the company produced 30% of the GNP of Algeria.  Annually it produced 206 million Tonne of Oil equivalent (ToE), including 24 million ToE, or 11.7% of total, for the Algerian domestic market. In 2021, the company's export revenues had increased by 75%, placing turnovers at US$35bn for the year compared to the US$20bn from the previous year. Vice-president, Rachid Zerdani, stated that the results can be explained by the "recovery of global economic activity in 2021". Production increased to 185 million ToE, resulting in export levels of 95 million ToE. Sonatrach employed over 53,000 employees, as well as more than 150,000 employed in its subsidiaries.

Other major fields operated by Sonatrach include Tin Fouye Tabankort Ordo, Zarzaitine, Haoud Berkaoui/Ben Kahla, and Ait Kheir.

The most important pipelines carry crude oil from the Hassi Messaoud field to export terminals. Sonatrach also operates oil condensate and LPG pipeline networks that link Hassi R'mel and other fields to Arzew. Sonatrach is expanding the Hassi Messaoud-Azrew pipeline, the longest in the country. The project entails a second, parallel line that will more than double the capacity of the existing line.

Sonatrach has some concessions in Libya, Mauritania, Peru, Yemen and Venezuela. The company has also diversified into petrochemistry and the desalination of seawater.

Selected Fields 

Notes: 1.EIA 2007.

History 

Sonatrach was founded on December 31, 1963. At the time, however, the Algerian state held only 4.5% of the exploration perimeters, while French interests were as high as 67.5%.

After the Arab-Israeli War in June 1967, Algeria decided to nationalize the refining and distribution activities of Mobil and Esso, and Sonatrach signed an agreement with Getty Oil on October 19, 1968 receiving 51% of Getty Oil's interests.

Sonatrach gained control over all Algerian petrochemical resources following President Houari Boumedienne's nationalisation of all French oil and gas holdings beginning on February 24, 1971. The old concession system was replaced by a seizure of a 51% share of French petroleum companies. Only TotalEnergies agreed to continue its activities; the other companies left Algeria.

Beginning on December 10, 1979, a conference on the exploitation of petroleum recommended increasing participation in the research efforts by foreign companies and countries. By a decree published in the Journal Officiel on May 17, 1980, Sonatrach was divided into four enterprises.

From 1986, it became possible for foreign hydrocarbon companies to do business in Algeria within a partnership with Sonatrach (this process was simplified in 1991). The Sonatrach-Gaz de France accord, signed on January 12, 1989, allowed the state to set a compromise price of about $2.30 per million BTUs. A total of 9.5 billion cubic meters of natural gas were delivered annually until 1990, and Sonatrach recovered 850 million francs in arrears, since the accord applied retroactively beginning on November 1, 1987.

In March 2005, the Algerian parliament adopted the hydrocarbon reform bill, encouraging international oil company (IOC) investment in the hydrocarbon sector, which Sonatrach previously dominated. However, 2006 amendments to the hydrocarbon bill created a windfall tax on IOC profits when oil prices top $30 per barrel. This tax reached up to 50% on some contracts. In addition, the amendments gave Sonatrach rights to a 51% or higher participation option on each newly discovered project.

In June 2018, Naturgy signed an agreement with Sonatrach covering 30% of Spain's natural gas imports by pipeline. Sonatrach holds a 4% stake in the shares for the Spanish natural gas distribution company. In 2019, the two companies took over joint control of the Medgaz pipeline between Algeria and Spain, with Sonatrach holding 51% stake and Naturgy the remaining 49%.

In April 2019, media reports revealed that Lord Energy SA, a controversial Swiss energy trading company linked to the Muslim Brotherhood and Al-Qaeda, had been involved in a corruption scandal within Sonatrach. Sonatrach PDG Abdelmoumen Ould Kaddour was let go a few days after Algerian Vice Minister of Defence Ahmed Gaïd Salah announced the launch of an investigation into the links between executives of Sonatrach and Lord Energy founder, Hazim Nada, who is the son of Youssef Nada, a high-level executive of the Muslim Brotherhood, whose companies have been accused by Bush the younger of financing Al-Qaeda.

On 22 July 2019, the Sonatrach-controlled oil tanker Mesdar was briefly detained as it transited the Straits of Hormuz by the Islamic Republic of Iran. This was a case of mistaken identities because Sonatrach contracted a UK-based operator for the vessel, and the government of Iran was at odds with the government of the UK over the seizure of the oil tanker Grace 1. When they realised their error and released the Mesdar, the seizure of the Stena Impero fulfilled the needs of the government of Iran.

In November 2021, Sonatrach announced that it would be carrying out the development of a 10 MWp photovoltaic plant in the basin of Hassi Berkine in order to supply oil sites within the region.

Sonatrach signed a US$179 million contract on 17 February 2022 with Sinopec from China, to construct an LNG storage tank which will hold 150,000m3 at the Skikda gas export terminal.

With the Russian invasion on the Ukraine, Sonatrach CEO Hakkar stated in February 2022, that the company would be willing to supply Europe with more gas, however only the unused capacities in the Trans-Mediterranean Pipeline (Transmed) could be transferred to the European market. The Transmed pipeline which is operated with Eni, has a yearly capacity of approximately 32 billion cubic meters, to which 22 billion cubic meters of exported gas is already accounted for in various contracts. However, in April 2022, Hakkar went back on his statement from February, saying that Sonatrach would not be able to be an alternative provider of Russian gas.

In March 2022, Sonatrach and Eni made a major discovery of oil and gas in the Zemlet el Arbi concession, as the HDLE-1 well was drilled, one of five to be placed in the Berkine North basin.

In August 2022, Sonatrach in collaboration with Eni made a new oil discovery at Haasi Illatou in the Adrar province. This discovery comes 28 years after the last discovery of oil in the region.

Subsidiaries and Joint Ventures 

Sonatrach owns 50% of Numhyd, a joint venture with Tunisia's ETAP, and ALEPCO, a joint venture with Libya's National Oil Corporation. In 1998, Sonatrach acquired Naftal, which is the principal company selling petroleum-based fuels for domestic consumption with about 10,000 gas stations (as of 2005). The Skikda refinery (300,000 bpd) provides the bulk of Algeria's refined products production. The  Hassi Messaoud refinery supplies products to southern Algeria, while the  Algiers refinery processes crude from Hassi Messaoud for consumption in the capital. Finally, the coastal  Arzew refinery produces products for domestic consumption and export.
On July 1, 2018, Sonatrach appointed Youcef Ghazli to head the Foreign Investment Division, which oversees all investments in Europe.

In March 2022, Naftal officials signed a US$364 million engineering, procurement and construction (EPC) contract with Sonatrach's pipeline unit TRC. The pipeline should only take about 48 months to construct, and it would run 424 km from Arzew to Chlef, carrying about 1.2 million tonnes of LPG a year.

Tassili Airlines 
A joint venture between Air Algérie (49%) and Sonatrach (51%) in 1998 established the passenger airline company Tassili Airlines. Commercial services were launched on 8 April 1999 with a flight from Hassi Messaoud to Algiers. In 2005, Air Algérie withdrew its funds in the airline, which thus became wholly owned by Sonatrach.  In 2006, Sonatrach gave Tassili Airlines permission to expand its domestic destinations and for the future opening of international routes.

Eni 
In July 2020, Sonatrach signed a contract with Italian company Eni. The contract which will run until 2049, includes the production marketing from three gas fields located in the south-east of the country. The three fields are Sif Fatima II, Zemlet El Arbi and Ourhoud II. An additional memorandum of understanding (MoU) was signed in December 2020 in order to boost exploration and production, as well as implement training activities. In March 2021, a new MoU was signed between the companies to focus on renewable energy, biofuels and hydrogen sectors. Various other agreements were also signed to cover exploration and production, research and development, decarbonization and training, and to strengthen the two companies' partnership. In April 2022, the CEOs of Sonatrach, Touffik Hakkar, and Eni, Claudio Descalzi, signed a contract to increase gas supplies to Italy through the Trans-Mediterranean Pipeline. Beginning in 2022, supply should increase gradually to 9 billion cubic meters per year in 2023-24.

Naturgy 
In June 2018, Naturgy signed an agreement with Sonatrach covering 30% of Spain's natural gas imports by pipeline. Sonatrach holds a 4% stake in the shares for the Spanish natural gas distribution company. In 2019, the two companies took over joint control of Medgaz, with Sonatrach holding 51% stake and Naturgy the remaining 49%. Renegotiations of the supply agreement were made in 2020, in order to revise the prices, volume and duration.

Algerian Hydrocarbon Sector 

Hydrocarbons play a crucial role in Algeria's economy, accounting for roughly 60% of budget revenues and over 95% of export earnings. The country ranks fourteenth in petroleum reserves, containing  of proven oil reserves with estimates suggesting that the actual amount is even more. The U.S. Energy Information Administration reported that in 2005, Algeria had 160 trillion cubic feet (Tcf) of proven natural gas reserves, the eighth largest in the world. As a result, Sonatrach is very important politically.  Most Energy Ministers of Algeria have come from a Sonatrach background.

Corruption scandals 

Sonatrach suspended all of its senior management after two of the company's vice-presidents were imprisoned for corruption. Algeria's Energy Minister, Chakib Khelil announced the president of the company and several executives have been placed under judicial supervision. In 2013, Khelil was also accused of receiving a bribe from a subsidiary of the Italian energy company Eni.

In May 2020, an arrest warrant was issued against a representative of Sonatrach in Lebanon, as part of a greater operation against embezzlement of public funds in contribution with Lebanese officials. Abdelmoumen Ould Kaddour, who was chief executive of Sonatrach from March 2017 to April 2019, was arrested in February 2021, and in August of that year he was extradited from the United Arab Emirates, all related to his alleged involvement in various corruption cases. In February 2022, ex-energy minister Chakib Khelil was sentenced in absentia to 20 years in prison for corruption. Mohamed Meziane, CEO of Sonatrach from 2003 to 2010, was fined  and sentenced to 5 years in prison.

Presidents 
 Sid Ahmed Ghozali (1966–1977)
 Yousef Yousfi (1985–1988)
 Sadek Boussena (1988–1990)
 Abdelhak Bouhafs (1990–1995)
 Nazim Zouioueche (March 1999 – 2000)
 Chakib Khelil (March 2001 – 2003)
 Mohamed Meziane  (September 2003 – 2010)
 Nordine Cherouati (May 2010 – December 2011)
 Abdelhamid Zerguine (December 2011 – July 2014)
 Said Sahnoune (July 2014 – June 2015)
 Amine Mazouzi (June 2015 – March 2017)
 Abdelmoumen Ould Kaddour (March 2017 – April 2019)
 Rachid Hachichi (April 2019 – November 2019)
 Kamel Eddine Chikhi (November 2019 – February 2020)
 Toufik Hakkar (February 2020 – present)

See also 

 LNG El Paso Sonatrach

Notes

References 

 Energy Information Administration (2007) Algeria: Country Analysis Brief
 Sonatrach Annual Report 2003
 World Bank (2006), [Algeria: Economic Report], Social & Economic Development Group: MENA Region
 P. Mobbs (2002) Mineral Industry of Algeria
 Thomas S. Ahlbrandt (2001) Sirte Basin Province: Sirte-Zelten Total Petroleum System U.S. Geological Survey
 Sonatrach official site (in French)
 Sonatrach: The Political Economic of an Algerian State Institution, John Entelis, 2000
 Sonatrach history
 New projects of Edison S.p.A.
 Project GALSI (in French)
 L'alliance entre Gazprom et Sonatrach trouble l'Europe, Le Figaro 7 August 2006 (in French)
 Naftal.dz

External links 
 Sonatrach
 Sonatrach 
 Sonatrach 

Oil and gas companies of Algeria
Algeria
Government-owned companies of Algeria
Companies based in Algiers
Energy companies established in 1963
Non-renewable resource companies established in 1963
1963 establishments in Algeria
Algerian brands